Jorge Wagner Goés Conceição, or simply Jorge Wagner (born 17 November 1978), is a Brazilian former footballer.

Mainly an attacking midfielder, but could also play as a left midfielder, left wing-back, left winger, central midfielder and left back, Jorge Wagner was known for his versatility, creativity and fierce shot.

Career

Bahia
Wágner played for Esporte Clube Bahia during the 2000/2001 season, scoring 7 goals in 23 appearances.

Cruzeiro
He then moved to Cruzeiro Esporte Clube where he made 33 league appearances, scoring 4 goals.

Lokomotiv Moscow
Wágner then moved to FC Lokomotiv Moscow in 2003. He made only 7 league appearances before being loaned to Corinthians where he made 18 league appearances. He returned to FC Lokomotiv Moscow where he made only 6 more league appearances.

Internacional
Wágner then moved to Internacional in 2005 where he made 13 first team appearances, scoring 4 goals. In 2006, during his second season with Internacional he won the Copa Libertadores beating rivals São Paulo Futebol Clube.

Real Betis
Wágner moved to Betis in August 2006. He was purchased for €200,000. Wágner made his Betis debut against Athletic Bilbao on 10 September 2006 at the Manuel Ruiz de Lopera stadium, which Betis won 3–0. He came on as a second-half substitute.

São Paulo
Wágner was then loaned to São Paulo from Betis for 2007 season where he missed the early rounds of the season through injury. However, after regaining full fitness he enjoyed 1st team football and went on to win the Campeonato Brasileiro in 2007 and was voted the best left midfielder by the CBF. São Paulo have since agreed a permanent deal with Betis and Wágner has signed a 3-year deal.

In Japan
On 7 July 2010, Jorge Wagner sign a contract to 2011 with Japanese club Kashiwa Reysol. He was one of the key players in Reysol's first ever J1 League winning campaign, recording 11 goals in 31 appearances. He was also named J. League Best Eleven award after the season.

Vitória

On 20 January 2015 Jorge Wágner was signed by Brazilian club Vitória.

Brazilian team

In 2008, Jorge Wagner, still uncapped for the national team at any level, according to O Globo, was in a list of 74 players who could be called up by coach Dunga to play 2008 Summer Olympics for Brazilian team. However, Jorge Wagner was not called up to play that competition.

Club statistics

Honours
Bahia
 Bahia State League: 1
 1998
Cruzeiro
 South Minas Cup: 2
 2001, 2002
 Minas Gerais State League: 2
 2001, 2002
Corinthians
 São Paulo State League: 1
 2003
Lokomotiv Moscow
 Championship of Russia: 1
 2004
Internacional
 Rio Grande do Sul State League: 1
 2005
 Copa Libertadores: 1
 2006
São Paulo
 Brazilian League: 2
 2007, 2008
Kashiwa Reysol
 J1 League: 1
 2011
Individual
 J. League Best Eleven: 1
 2011

References

External links 

 CBF
 globoesporte.globo.com
 sambafoot
 saopaulofc.net

1978 births
Living people
Brazilian footballers
Brazilian expatriate footballers
Esporte Clube Bahia players
Cruzeiro Esporte Clube players
Sport Club Corinthians Paulista players
FC Lokomotiv Moscow players
Sport Club Internacional players
Real Betis players
São Paulo FC players
Kashiwa Reysol players
Botafogo de Futebol e Regatas players
Expatriate footballers in Spain
Expatriate footballers in Japan
Expatriate footballers in Russia
Campeonato Brasileiro Série A players
Russian Premier League players
La Liga players
J1 League players
Kashima Antlers players
Esporte Clube Vitória players
People from Feira de Santana
Association football midfielders
Sportspeople from Bahia